Paula Andrea Rodriguez Rueda (born 7 July 1996) is a Colombian chess player. She is a Woman International Master.

She won the Women's Colombian Chess Championship in 2013.

, she is ranked world number 20 girl player.

References

External links 
 
 FIDE ratings
 

1996 births
Living people
Colombian female chess players
Chess International Masters
Chess Woman International Masters
21st-century Colombian women